Hydnellum fennicum is a species of tooth fungus in the family Bankeraceae. It was originally described by Petter Karsten in 1882 as a variety of Sarcodon scabrosus. Karsten promoted it to a distinct species in 1887. It is considered critically endangered in Switzerland. It is inedible.

References

External links
 

Fungi described in 1882
Fungi of Europe
fennicum
Inedible fungi
Taxa named by Petter Adolf Karsten